James Creek is a  long 3rd order tributary to the Little River in Hoke and Moore Counties, North Carolina.

Course
James Creek rises on the Jennie Creek divide about 1 mile south of Southern Pines in Moore County, North Carolina.  James Creek then flows northeasterly to meet the Little River about 2 miles northeast of Inverness.

Watershed
James Creek drains  of area, receives about 47.8 in/year of precipitation, has a topographic wetness index of 456.69 and is about 55% forested.

References

Rivers of North Carolina
Rivers of Hoke County, North Carolina
Rivers of Moore County, North Carolina